Richland County is a county in the U.S. state of Montana. As of the 2020 census, the population was 11,491. Its county seat is Sidney.

Richland County was created by the Montana Legislature in 1914 from part of Dawson County. An early proposed name for the county was Gate, but Richland was decided upon instead as a way to entice new settlers.

Geography

Major highways
  Montana Highway 16
  Montana Highway 23
  Montana Highway 200

Adjacent counties

 Roosevelt County – north
 Williams County, North Dakota – northeast
 McKenzie County, North Dakota – east
 Wibaux County - south
 Dawson County – southwest
 McCone County - west

Demographics

2000 census
As of the 2000 United States census, there were 9,667 people, 3,878 households, and 2,652 families in the county. The population density was 5 people per square mile (2/km2). There were 4,557 housing units at an average density of 2 per square mile (1/km2). The racial makeup of the county was 96.57% White, 0.09% Black or African American, 1.46% Native American, 0.18% Asian, 0.01% Pacific Islander, 0.85% from other races, and 0.85% from two or more races. 2.16% of the population were Hispanic or Latino of any race. 32.3% were of German, 22.4% Norwegian, 7.2% Irish, 6.2% English and 5.4% American ancestry.

There were 3,878 households, out of which 33.60% had children under the age of 18 living with them, 57.30% were married couples living together, 7.40% had a female householder with no husband present, and 31.60% were non-families. 28.80% of all households were made up of individuals, and 12.90% had someone living alone who was 65 years of age or older. The average household size was 2.46 and the average family size was 3.04.

The county population contained 27.50% under the age of 18, 6.40% from 18 to 24, 26.80% from 25 to 44, 23.80% from 45 to 64, and 15.60% who were 65 years of age or older. The median age was 39 years. For every 100 females there were 98.70 males. For every 100 females age 18 and over, there were 94.90 males.

The median income for a household in the county was $32,110, and the median income for a family was $39,348. Males had a median income of $29,069 versus $19,203 for females. The per capita income for the county was $16,006. About 8.10% of families and 12.20% of the population were below the poverty line, including 13.90% of those under age 18 and 9.00% of those age 65 or over.

2010 census
As of the 2010 United States census, there were 9,746 people, 4,167 households, and 2,698 families in the county. The racial makeup of the county was 95.0% white, 1.7% American Indian, 0.2% Asian, 0.1% black or African American, 0.8% from other races, and 2.1% from two or more races. Those of Hispanic or Latino origin made up 3.0% of the population. In terms of ancestry, 37.8% were German, 23.1% were Norwegian, 13.0% were Irish, 8.7% were American, and 6.5% were English.

Of the 4,167 households, 28.9% had children under the age of 18 living with them, 51.9% were married couples living together, 7.6% had a female householder with no husband present, 35.3% were non-families, and 29.8% of all households were made up of individuals. The average household size was 2.33 and the average family size was 2.88. The median age was 41.3 years.

The median income for a household in the county was $52,516 and the median income for a family was $60,236. Males had a median income of $44,788 versus $23,135 for females. The per capita income for the county was $26,888. About 10.2% of families and 13.5% of the population were below the poverty line, including 16.6% of those under age 18 and 14.4% of those age 65 or over.

Economy
Although most of the surface land of the county is devoted to ranching, oil exploration and production became important elements of the county's economy beginning with the discovery in 2000 of Elm Coulee Oil Field, part of the Bakken formation.

Politics
Richland County voters have been reliably Republican, opting only one time for the Democratic Party candidate in national elections since 1948 (as of 2020).

Communities

City
 Sidney (county seat)

Town
 Fairview

Census-designated places
 Crane
 Fox Lake
 Savage

Other unincorporated places

 Andes
 Enid
 Lambert
 Ludington
 Nohly
 Ridgelawn
 Sioux Pass

See also
 List of lakes in Richland County, Montana
 List of mountains in Richland County, Montana
 National Register of Historic Places listings in Richland County MT

References

 
1914 establishments in Montana
Populated places established in 1914